Palkinsky (masculine), Palkinskaya (feminine), or Palkinskoye (neuter) may refer to:
Palkinsky District, a district of Leningrad Oblast
Palkinsky (rural locality) (Palkinskaya, Palkinskoye), name of several rural localities in Russia